Ana María Giunta (1 March 1943 – 14 March 2015) was an Argentine actress best known for her roles in A King and His Movie (1986), The Supporter (1991), and in Eversmile, New Jersey (1989).

Giunta was born in Concepción del Uruguay, Argentina and died in Buenos Aires from respiratory failure, aged 72.

References

External links
 

1943 births
2015 deaths
Argentine film actresses
People from Uruguay Department
Respiratory disease deaths in Argentina
Deaths from respiratory failure